Pirxana is a village in the Hajigabul Rayon of Azerbaijan.

References 

Populated places in Hajigabul District